CV-35 may refer to:

 USS Reprisal (CV-35), a United States Navy aircraft carrier that was scrapped before completion
 L3/35 or Carro Veloce CV-35, an Italian light tank
 Autovía CV-35, an autovía in Spain